Krishnan Vandhaan is a 1987 Indian Tamil language comedy drama film, directed by K. Vijayan and produced by Thengai Srinivasan. The film stars Sivaji Ganesan, K. R. Vijaya, Mohan and Rekha. The film failed at the box-office.

Cast
Sivaji Ganesan 
K. R. Vijaya 
Mohan
Rekha 
M. N. Nambiar 
K. A. Thangavelu
Thengai Srinivasan
Major Sundarrajan  in Guest Appearance
 C. R. Parthiban as Doctor
V. K. Ramasamy in Guest Appearance
Senthil  in Guest Appearance

Production
This was the first film produced by Thengai Srinivasan and the film's failure left him in deep financial trouble.

Soundtrack
The music was composed by Ilaiyaraaja. The songs were written by Ilaiyaraaja, Mu. Metha and Gangai Amaren.

References

External links
 

1980s Tamil-language films
1987 comedy-drama films
1987 films
Films directed by K. Vijayan
Films scored by Ilaiyaraaja
Indian comedy-drama films